The Tour du Faso is a 10-day road bicycle racing stage race held in Burkina Faso in the late fall. The race is organised by the Amaury Sport Organisation, which also organises the Tour de France, and since 2005, the race has been part of the UCI Africa Tour.

The race was first held in 1987 and until 1998 was reserved for amateurs. Since 2005, it is organised as a 2.2 event on the UCI Africa Tour. The race covered  in 2006 and is televised on the Versus cable channel. In 2014, the Tour was cancelled because of the Ebola outbreak. It was cancelled again in 2020 due to the COVID-19 pandemic and in 2022 due to security issues.

Winners

References

External links
Tour du Faso at letour.fr: official website.

Cycle races in Burkina Faso
UCI Africa Tour races
Recurring sporting events established in 1987
1987 establishments in Burkina Faso